Ehra-Lessien is a municipality in the district of Gifhorn, in Lower Saxony, Germany. The Municipality Ehra-Lessien includes the villages of Ehra and Lessien.

Volkswagen Group test track

Volkswagen Group owns a test track facility in Ehra-Lessien, some 18 kilometres north of its Wolfsburg factory. The facility was built during the Cold War. The location was chosen because, at the time,  it was in a no-fly zone only 10 kilometres west of the border between East Germany and West Germany, and thus secret prototypes could be tested out of sight of potential rivals.
 
The track is currently used by all Volkswagen Group subsidiaries and marques, such as Audi, Lamborghini, Bentley, Bugatti, SEAT, Škoda, and Porsche.

The facility features  of private tarmac, which includes a large variety of road surfaces and curves, used as test tracks to evaluate new and prototype vehicles. Although the straight portion of the track is perfectly flat and level for the entire length, when standing at one end of the straight one cannot see the far end due to the curvature of the Earth. Banked corners at both ends of the circuit allow for a high entry and exit speed to and from the straight, and to increase average speed during the  lap. The straight is especially useful for determining vehicle top speed, and is one of the few places on Earth that the Bugatti Veyron or the McLaren F1 can reach their top speed.

Notably, the top speed of the Bugatti Veyron and the McLaren F1 were recorded along this straight. In episode 2 of Season 9, aired on 4 February 2007 on BBC Two's Top Gear, presenter James May reached  in a Bugatti Veyron. The facility also appeared on National Geographic Channel's Man-Made, in episodes about the Bugatti Veyron and Chiron.

On 2 August 2019, Bugatti used a specially modified Chiron and broke the top speed record for a production car, reaching . The top speed was set by Andy Wallace and verified by the TÜV (Germany’s Technical Inspection Association). Reportedly, Bugatti had spent the prior twelve months preparing for this new high speed record run. This high speed run is demonstrated on the Top Gear YouTube channel, on a video, posted on 2 September 2019.

Gallery

References

Volkswagen Group
Road test tracks by manufacturer
Road test tracks
Gifhorn (district)